Hoopoes are colourful birds found across Africa, Asia, and Europe, notable for their distinctive "crown" of feathers. Three living and one extinct species are recognized, though for many years all of the extant species were lumped as a single species—Upupa epops. In fact, some taxonomists still consider all three species conspecific.  Some authorities also keep the African and Eurasian hoopoe together but split the Madagascar hoopoe. The Eurasian hoopoe is common in its range and has a large population, so it is evaluated as Least Concern on The IUCN Red List of Threatened Species. However, their numbers are declining in Western Europe. Conversely, the hoopoe has been increasing in numbers at the tip of the South Sinai, Sharm el-Sheikh. There are dozens of nesting pairs that remain resident all year round.

Taxonomy
The genus Upupa was introduced in 1758  by the Swedish naturalist Carl Linnaeus in the tenth edition of his Systema Naturae. The type species is the Eurasian hoopoe (Upupa epops). Upupa and ἔποψ (epops) are respectively the Latin and Ancient Greek names for the hoopoe; both, like the English name, are onomatopoeic forms which imitate the cry of the bird.

The hoopoe was classified in the clade Coraciiformes, which also includes kingfishers, bee-eaters, and rollers. A close relationship between the hoopoe and the wood hoopoes is also supported by the shared and unique nature of their stapes. In the Sibley-Ahlquist taxonomy, the hoopoe is separated from the Coraciiformes as a separate order, the Upupiformes. Some authorities place the wood hoopoes in the Upupiformes as well. Now the consensus is that both hoopoe and the wood hoopoes belong with the hornbills in the Bucerotiformes.

The fossil record of the hoopoes is very incomplete, with the earliest fossil coming from the Quaternary. The fossil record of their relatives is older, with fossil wood hoopoes dating back to the Miocene and those of an extinct related family, the Messelirrisoridae, dating from the Eocene.

Species
Formerly considered a single species, the hoopoe has been split into three separate species: the Eurasian hoopoe, Madagascar hoopoe  and the resident African hoopoe.  One accepted separate species, the Saint Helena hoopoe, lived on the island of St Helena but became extinct in the 16th century, presumably due to introduced species.

The genus Upupa was created by Linnaeus in his Systema naturae in 1758. It then included three other species with long curved bills:

U. eremita (now Geronticus eremita), the northern bald ibis
U. pyrrhocorax (now Pyrrhocorax pyrrhocorax), the red-billed chough
U. paradisea

Formerly, the greater hoopoe-lark was also considered to be a member of this genus (as Upupa alaudipes).

Extant species

Distribution and habitat

Hoopoes are widespread in Europe, Asia, and North Africa, Sub-Saharan Africa and Madagascar. Most European and north Asian birds migrate to the tropics in winter. In contrast, the African populations are sedentary all year. The species has been a vagrant in Alaska; U. e. saturata was recorded there in 1975 in the Yukon Delta. Hoopoes have been known to breed north of their European range, and in southern England during warm, dry summers that provide plenty of grasshoppers and similar insects, although as of the early 1980s northern European populations were reported to be in the decline, possibly due to changes in climate.

The hoopoe has two basic requirements of its habitat: bare or lightly vegetated ground on which to forage and vertical surfaces with cavities (such as trees, cliffs or even walls, nestboxes, haystacks, and abandoned burrows) in which to nest. These requirements can be provided in a wide range of ecosystems, and as a consequence the hoopoe inhabits a wide range of habitats such as heathland, wooded steppes, savannas and grasslands, as well as forest glades. The Madagascar species also makes use of more dense primary forest. The modification of natural habitats by humans for various agricultural purposes has led to hoopoes becoming common in olive groves, orchards, vineyards, parkland and farmland, although they are less common and are declining in intensively farmed areas. Hunting is of concern in southern Europe and Asia.

Hoopoes make seasonal movements in response to rain in some regions such as in Ceylon and in the Western Ghats. Birds have been seen at high altitudes during migration across the Himalayas.

Behaviour and ecology
In what was long thought to be a defensive posture, hoopoes sunbathe by spreading out their wings and tail low against the ground and tilting their head up; they often fold their wings and preen halfway through. They also enjoy taking dust and sand baths. Adults may begin their moult after the breeding season and continue after they have migrated for the winter.

Diet and feeding

The diet of the hoopoe is mostly composed of insects, although small reptiles, frogs and plant matter such as seeds and berries are sometimes taken as well. It is a solitary forager which typically feeds on the ground. More rarely they will feed in the air, where their strong and rounded wings make them fast and manoeuverable, in pursuit of numerous swarming insects. More commonly their foraging style is to stride over relatively open ground and periodically pause to probe the ground with the full length of their bill. Insect larvae, pupae and mole crickets are detected by the bill and either extracted or dug out with the strong feet. Hoopoes will also feed on insects on the surface, probe into piles of leaves, and even use the bill to lever large stones and flake off bark. Common diet items include crickets, locusts, beetles, earwigs, cicadas, ant lions, bugs and ants. Larger prey items are beaten against the ground or a preferred stone to kill them and remove indigestible body parts such as wings and legs.

Breeding
Hoopoes are monogamous, although the pair bond apparently only lasts for a single season.  They are also territorial. The male calls frequently to advertise his ownership of the territory. Chases and fights between rival males (and sometimes females) are common and can be brutal.  Birds will try to stab rivals with their bills, and individuals are occasionally blinded in fights. The nest is in a hole in a tree or wall, and has a narrow entrance. It may be unlined, or various scraps may be collected. The female alone is responsible for incubating the eggs. Clutch size varies with location: Northern Hemisphere birds lay more eggs than those in the Southern Hemisphere, and birds at higher latitudes have larger clutches than those closer to the equator. In central and northern Europe and Asia the clutch size is around 12, whereas it is around four in the tropics and seven in the subtropics. The eggs are round and milky blue when laid, but quickly discolour in the increasingly dirty nest. They weigh . A replacement clutch is possible.

Hoopoes have well-developed anti-predator defences in the nest. The uropygial gland of the incubating and brooding female is quickly modified to produce a foul-smelling liquid, and the glands of nestlings do so as well. These secretions are rubbed into the plumage. The secretion, which smells like rotting meat, is thought to help deter predators, as well as deter parasites and possibly act as an antibacterial agent. The secretions stop soon before the young leave the nest. From the age of six days, nestlings can also direct streams of faeces at intruders, and will hiss at them in a snake-like fashion. The young also strike with their bill or with one wing.

The incubation period for the species is between 15 and 18 days, during which time the male feeds the female. Incubation begins as soon as the first egg is laid, so the chicks are born asynchronously. The chicks hatch with a covering of downy feathers. By around day three to five, feather quills emerge which will become the adult feathers. The chicks are brooded by the female for between 9 and 14 days. The female later joins the male in the task of bringing food. The young fledge in 26 to 29 days and remain with the parents for about a week more.

Relationship with humans
The diet of the hoopoe includes many species considered by humans to be pests, such as the pupae of the processionary moth, a damaging forest pest which few other birds will eat because of its irritating hairs. For this reason the species is afforded protection under the law in many countries.

In folklore, myth and religion
Hoopoes are distinctive birds and have made a cultural impact over much of their range. They were considered sacred in Ancient Egypt, and were "depicted on the walls of tombs and temples". At the Old Kingdom, the hoopoe was used in the iconography as a symbolic code to indicate the child was the heir and successor of his father. They achieved a similar standing in Minoan Crete.

In the Torah, Leviticus 11:13–19, hoopoes were listed among the animals that are detestable and should not be eaten. They are also listed in Deuteronomy as not kosher.

The connection of the hoopoe with Solomon and the Queen of Sheba in the Qur'anic tradition is mentioned in passing in Rudyard Kipling's Just So story "The Butterfly that Stamped".

In the pre-Islamic Vainakh religion of Chechnya, Ingushetia and Dagestan the hoopoe was sacred to the goddess Tusholi and known as "Tusholi's hen". As her bird, it could only be hunted with the express permission of the goddess's high priest, and even then only for strictly medicinal purposes.   

Hoopoes were seen as a symbol of virtue in Persia. A hoopoe was a leader of the birds in the Persian book of poems The Conference of the Birds ("Mantiq al-Tayr" by Attar) and when the birds seek a king, the hoopoe points out that the Simurgh was the king of the birds.

Hoopoes were thought of as thieves across much of Europe, and harbingers of war in Scandinavia. In Estonian tradition, hoopoes are strongly connected with death and the underworld; their song is believed to foreshadow death for many people or cattle.  In medieval ritual magic, the hoopoe was thought to be an evil bird.  The Munich Manual of Demonic Magic, a collection of magical spells compiled in Germany frequently requires the sacrifice of a hoopoe to summon demons and perform other magical intentions.

Tereus, transformed into the hoopoe, is the king of the birds in the Ancient Greek comedy The Birds by Aristophanes. In Ovid's Metamorphoses, book 6, King Tereus of Thrace rapes Philomela, his wife Procne's sister, and cuts out her tongue. In revenge, Procne kills their son Itys and serves him as a stew to his father. When Tereus sees the boy's head, which is served on a platter, he grabs a sword but just as he attempts to kill the sisters, they are turned into birds—Procne into a swallow and Philomela into a nightingale. Tereus himself is turned into an epops (6.674), translated as lapwing by Dryden and lappewincke (lappewinge) by John Gower in his Confessio Amantis, or hoopoe in A.S. Kline's translation. The bird's crest indicates his royal status, and his long, sharp beak is a symbol of his violent nature. English translators and poets probably had the northern lapwing in mind, considering its crest.

As emblem
The hoopoe was chosen as the national bird of Israel in May 2008 in conjunction with the country's 60th anniversary, following a national survey of 155,000 citizens, outpolling the white-spectacled bulbul. The hoopoe appears on the logo of the University of Johannesburg and is the official mascot of the university's sports teams. The municipalities of Armstedt and Brechten, Germany, have a hoopoe in their coats of arms.

Use in folk medicine
In Morocco, hoopoes are traded live and as medicinal products in the markets, primarily in herbalist shops. This trade is unregulated and a potential threat to local populations.

In Manipur, one of the states comprising Northeast India, the hoopoe is still used by traditional Muslim healers in a variety of preparations believed locally to benefit a number of conditions both medical and spiritual.
Manipur abuts upon Myanmar and has been a cultural crossroads and melting pot of cultures for over 2,500 years. Its traditional medicine may thus reflect influences from an unusually wide area, including not only the Indian subcontinent but also Central Asia, Southeast Asia, East Asia and even the further-flung regions of Siberia, the Arctic, Micronesia and Polynesia. Ibopishak and Bimola record four Manipuri folk medicinal uses of the hoopoe which specify neither the body part of the bird used nor its method of preparation: 
as a tranquilizer
in the treatment of abdominal pain, 
in the treatment of kidney and bladder disorders
in the "prevention of leprosy"
More specifically, it is believed that if an essence (method of preparation unspecified) prepared from the bird is dropped into the eye, it will remove superfluous eyelashes and strengthen the memory. 

Furthermore the authors record the following local Manipuri beliefs concerning  specific body parts of the hoopoe:
that its meat prevents frequent urination; 
that its feathers have the insecticidal property of  killing ants and fleas 
that its blood banishes fairies (jinn) and nightmares
that its heart cures (unspecified) diseases 
that its claws can be used to cure speech disorders.

While Ibopishak and Bimola are unable to find any discernible effect of hoopoe tissue alone upon the dissolution of kidney stones, they do note that their experiments reveal that hoopoe tissue potentiates the effects of the Manipuri medicinal plant Cissus javana, when employed to treat such calculi (local healers use bird and plant in just such a combination for this purpose). Since, however, there was no control used involving the tissues of any other bird species, it remains unclear whether there are any medicinal properties peculiar to hoopoe tissue deriving from a distinctive chemistry.

In popular culture
Harrison Tordoff, a World War II fighter ace and later a noted ornithologist, named his P-51 Mustang as Upupa epops, the scientific name of the hoopoe bird.

The questioned sighting of a blue-crested hoopoe in the British countryside is the basis of “A Rare Bird,” a 2012 episode of the British mystery series Midsomer Murders.

References

External links

 "Hoopoe" in The Atlas of Southern African Birds
 Ageing and sexing (PDF; 5.3 MB) by Javier Blasco-Zumeta & Gerd-Michael Heinze
 Hoopoe videos, photos & sounds in the Internet Bird Collection
 
 

Birds described in 1758
Birds of Africa
Birds of East Africa
 
Bucerotiformes
Coraciiformes
National symbols of Israel
Taxa named by Carl Linnaeus